The 1998 Davidoff Swiss Indoors was a tennis tournament played on indoor hard courts. It was the 29th edition of the event known that year as the Davidoff Swiss Indoors, and was part of the World Series of the 1998 ATP Tour. It took place at the St. Jakobshalle in Basel, Switzerland, from October 5 through October 11, 1998.

Tim Henman and Marc Rosset were the defending champions, but Henman did not compete this year in order to focus on the singles tournament. Rosset teamed up with Nicolas Kiefer and lost in the first round to tournament winners Olivier Delaître and Fabrice Santoro.

Delaître and Santoro won the title by defeating Piet Norval and Kevin Ullyett 6–3, 7–6 in the final.

Seeds
Champion seeds are indicated in bold text while text in italics indicates the round in which those seeds were eliminated.

Draw

Finals

References

External links
 Official results archive (ATP)
 Official results archive (ITF)

Doubles
1998 Davidoff Swiss Indoors